Charlie Chan's Courage (1934) is the fifth film in which Warner Oland played detective Charlie Chan. It is a remake of the 1927 silent film The Chinese Parrot, based upon the novel by Earl Derr Biggers. Both are considered lost films.

An audio recreation accompanied by still photographs from the original film is included as a special feature on some DVD collections.

Plot
Chan is hired to transport a pearl necklace. When his employer is murdered, he sets out to unmask the killer.

Cast
Warner Oland as Charlie Chan
Drue Leyton as Paula Graham
Donald Woods as Bob Crawford
Paul Harvey as J.P. Madden / Jerry Delaney
Murray Kinnell as Martin Thorne
Reginald Mason as Alexander Crawford
Virginia Hammond as Mrs. Sally Jordan
Si Jenks as Will Holley
Harvey Clark as Professor Gamble
Jerry Jerome as Maydorf
Jack Carter as Victor Jordan
James Wang as Wong
DeWitt Jennings as Constable Brackett (as DeWitt C. Jennings)
Francis Ford as Hewitt

External links

References

1934 films
1930s mystery films
1930s crime thriller films
American crime thriller films
Remakes of American films
American black-and-white films
Charlie Chan films
American detective films
Films based on American novels
Films directed by Eugene Forde
Sound film remakes of silent films
Lost American films
American mystery films
1934 lost films
Fox Film films
1930s English-language films
1930s American films